Pile is an English language surname. Notable people named Pile include

 Archibald Pile, Bajan landowner
 Sir Francis Pile, 2nd Baronet (c. 1617–1649), English politician
 General Sir Frederick Alfred Pile, 2nd Baronet and a British army officer who served in both World Wars
 James Pile (c. 1799–1885), Australian pastoralist
 Pile brothers, his sons William, John and Charles, pastoralists and racehorse owners
 William Pile (shipbuilder) (1822–1893), pioneer of composite clipper ship construction
 William A. Pile (1829–1889), US politician and minister from Missouri

See also
 Pile (disambiguation)
 Pyle (surname)
 Pyles (surname)